Wang Yanchun (1910 – March 19, 1984), born Wang Wusheng, was a People's Republic of China politician. He was born in Quyang County, Zhili Province (now Hebei Province). He joined the Chinese Communist Party in 1937.

References

1910 births
1984 deaths
People's Republic of China politicians from Hebei
Chinese Communist Party politicians from Hebei
Political office-holders in Hunan